The 2009-10 season will be the 97th season of competitive football in Libya.

The Premier League season will begin on October 1.

Promotion and Relegation

Teams promoted to Libyan Premier League 2009–10 
 Tahaddy Benghazi
 Najma Benghazi

Teams relegated to Libyan Second Division 2009–10 
Wefaq Sabratha
Aljazeera Sports Club
Wahda Tripoli
Aman al Aam

Teams promoted to Libyan Second Division 2009–10 
Reaf
Nusoor al Martouba

Teams relegated to Libyan Third Division 2009-10 
Dhahra Bani Waleed
Sikat al Hadid
Faaluja
Shabab al Wahdawi
Nusoor al Khaleej
Wefaq Ajdabiya
Hadaf
Hilal Tobruk

National team

Footnotes

References